Igor Grigoryevich Golubtsov (born April 13, 1955) is a Russian professional football functionary and coach.

Golubtsov managed FC Lada-Togliatti-VAZ Togliatti in the Russian First Division.

External links
 Career summary by KLISF

1955 births
Living people
Russian football managers
FC Lada-Tolyatti managers